The Moodys is an American comedy television series based on the Australian show The Moodys. It stars Denis Leary and Elizabeth Perkins as a cantankerous married couple who reunite with their three adult children in Chicago for the Christmas season. It premiered December 4, 2019 on Fox, and aired two half-hour episodes back-to-back for three weeks, for a total of six episodes for its first season. In July 2020, Fox renewed the series for a second season which premiered on April 1, 2021.

The series was originally to be called A Moody Christmas; the Australian series on which it is based was called A Moody Christmas in the first series. On April 16, 2021, Fox took The Moodys off the Thursday schedule. The remaining three episodes of the second season are rescheduled to air on Sundays starting June 6. On June 17, 2021, the series was canceled after two seasons. The series finale aired on June 20, 2021.

Cast

Main

 Denis Leary as Sean Moody Sr.
 Elizabeth Perkins as Ann Moody
 Francois Arnaud as Dan Moody
 Chelsea Frei as Bridget Moody
 Jay Baruchel as Sean Moody Jr.

Recurring

Maria Gabriela de Faria as Cora
Josh Segarra as Marco
Gerry Dee as Roger
Christopher Nicholas Smith as Nick

Guest
Kevin Bigley as Monty
Ulka Simone Mohanty as Mukta
Megan Park as Ali

Episodes

Series overview

Season 1 (2019)

Season 2 (2021)

Reception

Critical response
On Rotten Tomatoes, the series holds an approval rating of 64% with an average rating of 6.28/10, based on 14 reviews. The website's critical consensus states, "A solid cast and some decent jokes set the table, but The Moodys stale take on a curmudgeonly Christmas is too bah humbug in a bad way." On Metacritic, it has a weighted average score of 55 out of 100, based on 10 critics, indicating "mixed or average reviews".

Ratings

Season 1

Season 2

See also
 List of Christmas films

References

External links
 

2010s American sitcoms
2019 American television series debuts
2021 American television series endings
2020s American sitcoms
American television series based on Australian television series
Christmas television series
Fictional married couples
Fox Broadcasting Company original programming
Television series about dysfunctional families
Television series by CBS Studios
Television series by Fox Entertainment
Television shows set in Chicago